Barbara Eden (born Barbara Jean Morehead; August 23, 1931) is an American actress, singer, and producer best known for her starring role as Jeannie in the sitcom I Dream of Jeannie (1965–1970). Her other notable roles include Roslyn Pierce opposite Elvis Presley in Flaming Star (1960), Lieutenant jg Cathy Connors in Voyage to the Bottom of the Sea (1961), and a single widowed mother, Stella Johnson, in the film Harper Valley PTA (1978). Due to the success of the film, Eden reprised her role as Stella Johnson in a two-season television series, Harper Valley PTA.

Early years
Eden was born on August 23, 1931, in Tucson, Arizona, to Alice Mary (née Franklin) and Hubert Henry Morehead. She is a descendant of Benjamin Franklin. (For decades, her year of birth was thought to be 1934.) After her parents' divorce, her mother and she moved to San Francisco, where her mother married Harrison Connor Huffman, a telephone lineman, by whom she had a daughter, Eden's half-sister. The Great Depression deeply affected the family, and as they were unable to afford many luxuries, Alice entertained her children with singing.

Eden's first public performance was singing in the church choir, where she sang the solos. As a teenager, she sang in local bands (led by Howard Fredericks and Freddie Martin) for $10 (roughly equivalent to $157 in 2021) a night in night clubs. At age 16, she became a member of Actor's Equity, and studied singing at the San Francisco Conservatory of Music and acting with the Elizabeth Holloway School of Theatre. She graduated from Abraham Lincoln High School in San Francisco in the Spring Class of 1949 and studied theater for one year at City College of San Francisco. As Barbara Huffman, she was elected Miss San Francisco in 1951 and she also entered the Miss California pageant.

Television and film roles
Eden began her television career as a semiregular on The Johnny Carson Show in 1955. She also made featured appearances on shows such as The West Point Story, Highway Patrol, Private Secretary, I Love Lucy, The Millionaire, Target: The Corruptors!, Crossroads, Perry Mason, Gunsmoke, December Bride, Bachelor Father, Father Knows Best, Adventures in Paradise, The Andy Griffith Show, Cain's Hundred, Saints and Sinners, The Virginian, Slattery's People, The Rogues, and the series finale of Route 66. She guest-starred in four episodes of Burke's Law, playing different roles each time. She was an uncredited extra in the movie The Tarnished Angels with Rock Hudson, in partnership with 20th Century Fox studios. She then starred in the syndicated comedy TV series How to Marry a Millionaire. The series is based on the 1953 film of the same name.

Film director Mark Robson, who later directed Eden in the movie From the Terrace, took note of Eden's performance in a play with James Drury. and wanted her to work for 20th Century Fox studios. Her screen test was the Joanne Woodward role in No Down Payment (1957). Although she did not get the role, the studio gave Eden a contract. She did a screen test for the role of Betty Anderson in the 1957 film version of Peyton Place, but Terry Moore got the role. She had minor roles in Bailout at 43,000, Will Success Spoil Rock Hunter?, and The Wayward Girl, then became a leading lady in films, starring opposite Gary Crosby, Barry Coe, and Sal Mineo in A Private's Affair. She had a co-starring role in Flaming Star (1960), with Elvis Presley.

The following year, she played in a supporting role as Lt. Cathy Connors in Irwin Allen's Voyage to the Bottom of the Sea. She starred in The Wonderful World of the Brothers Grimm, a Cinerama film directed by George Pal for MGM, and another Irwin Allen production for 20th Century Fox, Five Weeks in a Balloon (1962). She was the female lead in the 1962 Fox comedy Swingin' Along, starring Tommy Noonan and Peter Marshall, in their final joint screen appearance. She did a screen test with Andy Williams for the 20th Century Fox movie State Fair, but did not get the role.

Her last film for 20th Century Fox was The Yellow Canary (1963). She left Fox and began guest-starring in television shows and acting in films for MGM, Universal, and Columbia. She played supporting roles over the next few years, including The Brass Bottle and 7 Faces of Dr. Lao.

I Dream of Jeannie

In 1965, producer Sidney Sheldon signed Eden to star in his upcoming fantasy sitcom I Dream of Jeannie for NBC. After various brunette starlets and beauty queens unsuccessfully tried out for the role, Eden was approached by Sheldon, who had seen her in The Brass Bottle and had received numerous recommendations for Eden from various colleagues. Eden played Jeannie, a beautiful genie set free from her bottle by astronaut and United States Air Force Captain (later Major) Anthony "Tony" Nelson, played by Larry Hagman.

Eden played this role for five years and 139 episodes. Additionally in eight episodes, Eden donned a brunette wig to portray Jeannie's evil sister (also Jeannie) who lusts after Tony Nelson, and in two episodes played Jeannie's hapless mother.

Later career
After Jeannie, Eden starred in an unaired pilot, The Barbara Eden Show, and another pilot, The Toy Game. Her first TV movie was called The Feminist and the Fuzz. Although she is best known for comedy, most of these films were dramas, as when she starred opposite her Jeannie co-star Larry Hagman in A Howling in the Woods (1971).

In The Stranger Within (1974), Eden played housewife Ann Collins, a woman impregnated by extraterrestrials. Later, Eden played a policewoman-turned-private detective investigating the disappearance of a missing heiress, in the critically acclaimed TV movie Stonestreet: Who Killed the Centerfold Model? (1977). She starred in and co-produced, with her own production company (MI-Bar Productions), the NBC-TV romantic comedy movie The Secret Life of Kathy McCormick (1988). She also starred in and produced the romantic comedy TV movie Opposites Attract (1990), co-starring John Forsythe.

In 1978, she starred in the feature film Harper Valley PTA, based on the popular country song. This led to a namesake television series in 1981. In both the movie and the TV series, Eden played the protagonist Stella Johnson. It was a comedy version of Peyton Place, with Anne Francine playing wealthy villainess Flora Simpson Reilly. In one episode, Stella dressed in a blue and gold genie costume, and in another, she played both Stella and her cousin Della Smith (similar to Jeannie's evil twin-sister character). It debuted January 16, 1981, winning 11 of its 13 time slots during the first season. It was renamed simply Harper Valley when it began its second season on October 29, 1981. During this time, Eden also became the spokeswoman for L'eggs pantyhose, and appeared in a series of print advertisements and TV commercials for the brand from 1979 to 1983.

From April 3 through September 16, 1984, Eden starred in the Lee Guber and Shelly Gross national production of the John Kander and Fred Ebb Tony Award-winning musical comedy Woman of the Year, playing the role of Tess Harding Craig, alongside Don Chastain (as Sam Craig), and Marilyn Cooper. In 1990, Eden played a recurring role as a billionairess seeking revenge against J.R. Ewing in five episodes of the final season of Dallas, as the captivating character LeeAnn de la Vega, reuniting her with Hagman. In her final episode, the character admits that her maiden name is Nelson (a production gag, as "Nelson" was the surname of Hagman's character and Eden's character's married name in I Dream of Jeannie). In 1991, she starred in the stage play Same Time, Next Year with Wayne Rogers, and reprised her role of Jeannie in a television movie-of-the-week. In 1993, she starred in an 11-city national tour of the play Last of the Red Hot Lovers with Don Knotts.

Eden starred in such musical comedies as Nite Club Confidential (playing the role of Kay Goodman, in 1996), The Sound of Music, Annie Get Your Gun, South Pacific with Robert Goulet, The Pajama Game with John Raitt, and Gentlemen Prefer Blondes playing Lorelei Lee. She has been a musical guest star in many variety television shows, including 21 Bob Hope specials, The Carol Burnett Show, The Jonathan Winters Show, The Jerry Lewis Show, This Is Tom Jones, Tony Orlando and Dawn, and Donny and Marie. She released an album titled Miss Barbara Eden in 1967 on Dot Records.

From 2000 to 2004, Eden starred in the national touring production of the play The Odd Couple: The Female Version playing the role of Florence Unger opposite Rita MacKenzie as Olive Madison. In March 2006, Eden reunited with her former co-star Larry Hagman for a publicity tour in New York City to promote the first-season DVD of I Dream of Jeannie. They appeared together on Good Morning America, The View, Access Hollywood, Entertainment Tonight, Martha, and Showbiz Tonight, among other shows.

In March 2006, Hagman and Eden again reunited, this time onstage in New York for Love Letters at the College of Staten Island, and at the United States Military Academy in West Point, New York. This was Eden's first return visit to the academy since appearing in the 1956 Ziv Television Programs, The West Point Story.
Eden starred in the play Love Letters with Hal Linden in 2006, and a guest-starring role on the Lifetime series Army Wives, written and produced by her niece Katherine Fugate. In December 2008 she began filming the TV movie Always and Forever for the Hallmark Channel, which aired in October 2009.

In May 2013, Eden appeared with former US President Bill Clinton, Elton John, and Fergie at the opening ceremony of the 21st Life Ball in Vienna, where Eden wore her famous Jeannie harem costume. In late 2013, Eden was cast in the movie One Song, filmed in Excelsior, Minnesota.

Eden has also done voice work for the animated children's television series Shimmer and Shine.

Personal life: Jeannie Out of the Bottle

Eden wrote a memoir, Jeannie Out of the Bottle, which was released on April 5, 2011, by Crown Archetype, a division of Random House. It debuted at number 14 on The New York Times Best Seller List.Jeannie Out of the Bottle chronicles her personal life and Hollywood career of more than 50 years, and includes intimate details about her early childhood, her rise to popularity in her teens and early 20s, her co-stars over the years, and her work leading up to I Dream of Jeannie. It also covers her marriages to Michael Ansara (1958–1974), Charles Fegert (1977–1982), and Jon Eicholtz (1991–present), and her "emotional breakdown" following the 2001 death of her son Matthew Ansara of a drug overdose.

In June 2021, Eden revealed while talking about her children's book Barbara and the Djinn, that her husband Jon Eicholtz and she had recovered from COVID-19.

Honors
On November 17, 1988, Eden received a star on the Hollywood Walk of Fame for her contributions to television. In 1990, the University of West Los Angeles School of Law granted Eden an honorary doctor of laws degree.

Filmography
Feature films

Television films

Television series

Selected stage productions

Discography
Singles

Albums

 Books 
Eden, Barbara, and Warburton, Dustin. Barbara and the Djinn. Neighborhood Publishers. 2021
Eden, Barbara, and Leigh, Wendy. Jeannie out of the Bottle. Norwalk, CT: Easton Press. 2011.
Smith, Joe. Las Vegas Celebrity Cookbook: The private recipes of 50 international entertainers. Hollybrooke House. 1982.

 Audiobooks 
 2011: Jeannie Out of the Bottle'', with Wendy Leigh (read by the author), Random House Audio,

References

External links

 
 
 
 
 Archive, emmytvlegends.org; accessed August 23, 2015.
 Interview with Barbara Eden, elvis.com.au; accessed February 24, 2014 
 Barbara Eden article, nydailynews.com; accessed August 23, 2015.
 Biodata, biography.com; accessed August 23, 2015.

1931 births
Living people
American film actresses
American television actresses
American stage actresses
American musical theatre actresses
American women singers
Actresses from San Francisco
Actresses from Tucson, Arizona
Singers from San Francisco
Singers from Arizona
20th-century American actresses
21st-century American actresses